South Norwood Recreation Ground is a park located in South Norwood in the London Borough of Croydon. In 1889, Croydon Corporation acquired the land and the borough surveyor estimated that it would cost just over £1,300 to lay out. Over a quarter of the projected cost was to install land drainage, which indicates that the site was quite wet.
The recreation ground includes a sports area, football pitches, tennis court, floodlit courts, bowling green with pavilion and a children's playground.

See also
List of Parks and Open Spaces in Croydon
South Norwood Library
Brickfields Meadow
Heavers Meadow
South Norwood Country Park
South Norwood Lake and Grounds

References

External links
Croydon Online History

Parks and open spaces in the London Borough of Croydon